ERT2 ("ERT Dyo") is a Greek free-to-air television channel owned and operated by state-owned public broadcaster Hellenic Broadcasting Corporation. It is the corporation's second television channel and it broadcasts documentaries, talkshows, current affairs programs, sporting events and children's shows.

It was originally referred to as "ERT2" and "ET2" (short for Ellinikí Tileórasi 2) but the name was later changed to "NET" (short for Néa Ellinikí Tileórasi), before changing back to "ERT2" by technically replacing NERIT Plus. Amid protests of the government's decision to close the public broadcaster, ERT staff continued to operate NET via satellite and internet. until November 7, 2013, when riot police stormed into ERT headquarters and took the internet programming of NET off the air.

History
On the 27th of February 1966, a second television channel was created by the Hellenic Armed Forces, the Armed Forces Television, which in 1970 became a fully-fledged second broadcaster as the Armed Forces Information Service (YENED). It contained news, sports, fashion, music, drama series and more rarely documentaries, films, and children programming.

On 3 November 1982, YENED passed under civilian control and was renamed as ERT2. Public broadcasters were the only broadcasters in Greece. ERT2 followed the same programming. In 1987, ERT and ERT2 became one company, ERT and the channels rebranded ET1 and ET2.

In 1997, ET2 was restructured as a news and information channel, airing documentaries and sports. It was therefore renamed as NET (Nea Elliniki Tileorasi/New Hellenic Television).

On 11 June 2013, NET was taken off air after the Greek government announced its decision to close ERT. Amid protests, NET continued to be broadcast via the Internet with the help of the European Broadcasting Union until November 7, 2013, when police forces invaded the ERT building and took the program off.

By ERT relaunch on June 11, 2015, the station returned as ERT2, technically replacing NERIT Plus in its space.

Programming

ERT2's shows included:

Athens Tower – The show, suggests our most important, the most interesting and different things that will happen or are happening in Athens and are output for entertainment and fun. Actions, events, entertainment, gastronomy, exhibitions, odd and the city's singularities, places and people that shape new trends and anything is created, moves and plays in Athens. Airs Saturdays at 6:30 pm.
The Era of Images - Katerina Zacharopoulou, observing the international artistic activity, meets and talks with artists, museum directors, and curators. The show focuses on the artistic discourse, the importance of large or smaller exhibitions in contemporary society and the Biennial European countries, presenting young artists with interesting jobs. Visiting museums and galleries with exhibitions that attract the interest of the general public.
Without Question - The documentary series, "Without question," is a series of film-documentary portraits of people of literature, science and art. Without asking the guest-hence the title of our broadcast only makes a personal narrative, as if it is addressed directly to the audience and tells us important pieces of his life and professional career.
Ancient Drama - In each episode, a different project is presented through the eyes and the interpretive approach of a modern director or coefficient of theatre at a time, in the form of a free course-workshop. The series aspires to him how to build a new proposal for a set of current research programs and teaching of ancient drama, as active researchers meetings of theatre with young actors within the framework of a public course.
Art Week - Shows that every week presents some of the most renowned Greek artists. Lena Aroni conversing with musicians, directors, writers, actors, artists, with people who, by the way, and dedication in their work, have won the recognition and love of the public. They speak for the way they approach their subject matter and describe joys and difficulties encountered in their path. Airs at 5:30 pm.

Foreign Series
Anne of Green Gables
Charlie Chaplin films
Laurel and Hardy films
Borgen
Seis Hermanas
Downton Abbey
Murdoch Mysteries
Upstairs and Downstairs
Parade's End
Dancing with Jazz

Live events
Eurovision Song Contest
Formula One (qualifying and race)

Children's  
Sesame Street
Doug
Mickey Mouse Works
Hercules
Darkwing Duck
Quack Pack
The Legend of Tarzan
Timon & Pumbaa
Disney Channel original films
Walt Disney Pictures films
Dragon Hunters
Noddy, Toyland Detective
Postman Pat (including SDS)
Distance education (via Educational Television of the Greek Ministry of Education and Religious Affairs)
Hey Duggee
Superhero Kindergarten

Logos and identities

See also
ERT
ERT1
ERT3
ERT News
ERT Sports

References

External links
ERT2

Hellenic Television
Television channels in Greece
Greek-language television stations
Television channels and stations established in 1982
1982 establishments in Greece
Public television in Greece